Crassispira microstoma is a species of sea snail, a marine gastropod mollusk in the family Pseudomelatomidae.

Description
The length of the shell attains 16 mm, its diameter 5 mm.

The solid, elongate, subturreted shell contains 9-10 whorls. This species is remarkable for having the first two whorls large, and not smooth and glassy as in most other species in this genus, but finely ribbed and lirated. The shell has a golden color. The aperture is very small, measuring about ⅓ of the total length. The siphonal canal is very short and recurved. The columella is callous and shows tubercles at the suture.  The sinus is small.

Distribution
This marine species occurs off Sri Lanka

References

External links
 

microstoma
Gastropods described in 1882